Ethel McClellan Plummer (1888–1936) was an American artist who resided primarily in New York. She worked primarily with drawings, prints, and paintings. She was the Vice President of the Society of Illustrators and Artists and exhibited at the Society of Independent Artists in 1910, the MacDowell Club in 1915, the Exhibition of Painting and Sculpture by Women Artists for the Benefit of Woman Suffrange Campaign at the Macbeth Gallery (1915). She worked as an illustrator for various magazines, including Life, Vogue, Shadowland, and Vanity Fair.

References

American illustrators
1888 births
1936 deaths
Artists from New York City